Winston Lake is a lake in the Unorganized Part of Kenora District in Northwestern Ontario, Canada. The primary inflow is an unnamed creek from Shea Lake, and the primary outflow is Winston Creek, which flows into Lac Seul. The lake is thus in the Hudson Bay drainage basin.

See also
List of lakes in Ontario

References

Lakes of Kenora District